Anna Marie Wooldridge  (August 6, 1930 – August 14, 2010), known professionally as Abbey Lincoln, was an American jazz vocalist, songwriter, and actress. She was a civil rights activist beginning in the 1960s. Lincoln made a career out of delivering deeply felt presentations of standards as well as writing and singing her own material.

Musician
Born in Chicago but raised in Calvin Center, Cass County, Michigan, Lincoln was one of many singers influenced by Billie Holiday. Her debut album, Abbey Lincoln's Affair – A Story of a Girl in Love, was followed by a series of albums for Riverside Records. In 1960 she sang on Max Roach's landmark civil rights-themed recording, We Insist! Lincoln's lyrics were often connected to the civil rights movement in America.  After a tour of Africa in the mid-1970s, she adopted the name Aminata Moseka.

During the 1980s, Lincoln's creative output was smaller and she released only a few albums. Her song "For All We Know" is featured in the 1989 film Drugstore Cowboy. During the 1990s and until her death, however, she fulfilled a 10-album contract with Verve Records.

These albums are highly regarded and represent a crowning achievement in Lincoln's career. Devil's Got Your Tongue (1992) featured Rodney Kendrick, Grady Tate, Yoron Israel, J. J. Johnson, Stanley Turrentine, Babatunde Olatunji and The Staple Singers, among others. In 2003, Lincoln received a National Endowment for the Arts Jazz Master Award.

Her lyrics often reflected the ideals of the civil rights movement and helped in generating passion for the cause in the minds of her listeners. In addition to her musical career, she ventured into acting as well and appeared in movies such as The Girl Can't Help It, Nothing But a Man and For Love of Ivy. She explored more philosophical themes during the later years of her songwriting career and remained professionally active until well into her seventies. She often visited the Blue Note jazz club in New York City.

Actress

In 1956 Lincoln appeared in The Girl Can't Help It, for which she wore a dress that had been worn by Marilyn Monroe in Gentlemen Prefer Blondes (1953), and interpreted the theme song, working with Benny Carter.

With Ivan Dixon, she co-starred in Nothing But a Man (1964), an independent film written and directed by Michael Roemer. In 1968 she co-starred with Sidney Poitier and Beau Bridges in For Love of Ivy and received a 1969 Golden Globe nomination for her appearance in the film.

Television appearances began in 1968 with The Name of the Game. In March 1969 for WGBH-TV Boston, in one of a 10-episode series of individual dramas written, produced and performed by blacks, "On Being Black," was her work in Alice Childress's Wine in the Wilderness. She appeared in Mission: Impossible (1971), the telemovie Short Walk to Daylight (1972), Marcus Welby, M.D. (1974), and All in the Family (1978).

In the 1990 Spike Lee movie Mo' Better Blues, Abbey Lincoln played the young Bleek's mother, Lillian.

Personal life
Lincoln was married from 1962 to 1970 to drummer Max Roach, whose daughter from a previous marriage, Maxine, appeared on several of Lincoln's albums.

Lincoln died on August 14, 2010, in Manhattan, eight days after her  80th birthday. Her death was announced by her brother, David Wooldridge, who told The New York Times that she had died in a Manhattan nursing home after suffering deteriorating health ever since undergoing  open-heart surgery in 2007. No cause of death was officially given. She was cremated and her ashes were scattered.

Discography

As leader 
 Abbey Lincoln's Affair...A Story of a Girl in Love (Liberty, 1957)
 That's Him! (Riverside, 1957)
 It's Magic (Riverside, 1958)
 Abbey Is Blue (Riverside, 1959)
 Straight Ahead (Candid, 1961)
 People in Me (Philips, 1973)
 Live in Misty (Kiva, 1973)
 Sessions, Live with Buddy Collette (Calliope, 1976)
 Sounds as a Roach with Max Roach (Joker, 1977)
 Golden Lady (Inner City, 1981)
 Talking to the Sun (Enja, 1984)
 Abbey Sings Billie (Enja, 1989)
 The World Is Falling Down (Verve, 1990)
 You Gotta Pay the Band with Stan Getz (Verve, 1991)
 Devil's Got Your Tongue (Verve, 1992)
 Abbey Sings Billie Volume 2 (Enja, 1992)
 When There Is Love with Hank Jones (Verve/Gitanes Jazz, 1993)
 Live/Music Is the Magic (ITM, 1994)
 A Turtle's Dream (Verve/Gitanes Jazz, 1995)
 Who Used to Dance (Verve/Gitanes Jazz, 1997)
 Wholly Earth (Verve/Gitanes Jazz, 1998)
 Love for Sale with Max Roach (West Wind, 1999)
 Over the Years (Verve/Gitanes Jazz, 2000)
 It's Me (Verve/Gitanes Jazz, 2003)
 Abbey Sings Abbey (Verve/Universal, 2007)
 Sophisticated Abbey: Live at the Keystone Korner (HighNote, 2015) – live recorded in 1980
 Love Having You Around: Live at the Keystone Korner Vol. 2 (HighNote, 2016) – live recorded in 1980

As guest
With Max Roach
 Moon Faced and Starry Eyed (Mercury, 1959)
 We Insist! (Candid, 1960)
 Percussion Bitter Sweet (Impulse!, 1961)
 It's Time (Impulse!, 1962)

With others
 Eric Dolphy and Benny Bailey, Newport Rebels (Candid, 1961)
 Frank Morgan, A Lovesome Thing (Antilles, 1991)
 Bheki Mseleku, Timelessness (Verve, 1994)
 Mal Waldron, Soul Eyes (BMG/RCA Victor, 1997)
 Cedar Walton, The Maestro (Muse, 1981)
 Steve Williamson, A Waltz for Grace (Verve, 1990)

References

External links

 
 Bio at Verve Records
 Abbey Lincoln Discography at JazzDiscography.com
 Abbey Lincoln at NPR Music—articles in the archive of NPR
 Abbey Lincoln Tribute and image 

1930 births
2010 deaths
20th-century African-American women singers
21st-century African-American women singers
African-American women singer-songwriters
American Ahmadis
American jazz singers
American Muslims
American women jazz singers
Candid Records artists
Capitol Records artists
Enja Records artists
HighNote Records artists
Inner City Records artists
Jazz musicians from Illinois
Jazz musicians from Michigan
Liberty Records artists
People from Cass County, Michigan
People from Chicago
Riverside Records artists
Singer-songwriters from Illinois
Singer-songwriters from Michigan
Verve Records artists